WISEPC J045853.90+643451.9 (designation is abbreviated to WISE 0458+6434) is a binary system of two (A and B) ultracool brown dwarfs of spectral classes T8.5 and T9.5, respectively, located in constellation Camelopardalis at approximately 47 ly from Earth.

History of observations

Discovery 
WISE 0458+6434 A was discovered in 2010 by A. Mainzer et al. from data, collected by Wide-field Infrared Survey Explorer (WISE) Earth-orbiting satellite — NASA infrared-wavelength 40 cm (16 in) space telescope, which mission lasted from December 2009 to February 2011.

In 2010 Mainzer et al. had conducted follow-up observations of WISE 0458+6434:
on 2010 March 17 (UT) YJH photometry with FanCam, an infrared imager operating at the University of Virginia’s Fan Mountain 31 in telescope;
on 2010 March 19 (UT) 1.5–2.3 μm spectroscopy with  near-infrared camera/spectrograph at the Large Binocular Telescope (LBT);
on 2010 Sep 12 (UT) 0.8–2.5 μm spectroscopy with SpeX on the 3.0 m NASA Infrared Telescope Facility on Mauna Kea.

In early 2011 Mainzer et al. published a paper in The Astrophysical Journal, where they presented discovery of one new found by WISE brown dwarf — ultra-cool object WISE 0458+6434. This object became the first brown dwarf, found by WISE.

Several months later, also in 2011, Kirkpatrick et al. published a paper in The Astrophysical Journal Supplement, where they presented characteristics of 104 first discovered by WISE brown dwarf systems — 98 new found systems and six systems, presented in published earlier papers (one in Mainzer et al. (2011), and five in Burgasser et al. (2011)), among which also was WISE 0458+6434.

Discovery of the companion 
WISE 0458+6434 B was discovered in 2011 by Gelino et al., when they examined for binarity nine brown dwarfs using Laser Guide Star Adaptive Optics system (LGS-AO) on Keck II telescope on Mauna Kea; seven of these nine brown dwarfs were also newfound, and two were discovered before, including WISE 0458+6434. These observations had indicated that two of these nine brown dwarfs, including WISE 0458+6434, are binary. Angular separation of WISE 0458+6434 components was 80 mas. Component B is also of late T-type — T9.5 (initially was estimated as T9).

Distance 
Currently the most accurate distance estimate of WISE 0458+6434 is a trigonometric parallax, measured using Spitzer Space Telescope and published in 2013 by Trent Dupuy and Adam Kraus: 0.070 ± 0.019 arcsec, corresponding to a distance 14.3 pc, or 46.6 ly.

WISE 0458+6434 distance estimates

Non-trigonometric distance estimates are marked in italic. The best estimate is marked in bold.

Space motion 
WISE 0458+6434 has proper motion of about 347 milliarcseconds per year.

WISE 0458+6434 proper motion estimates

The most accurate estimates are marked in bold.

Physical properties 
The brown dwarfs' temperature estimates are 600 K, or 327 °C (A) and 500 K, or 227 °C (B), both cooler than Venus.

NH3 in the spectrum of component B 
According proposed by Cushing et al. in 2011 T/Y transition standard, WISE J0458+6434 B does not relate to Y-type. However, its spectrum has feature similar to those in the spectra of the Y0 dwarfs WISE 1405+5534 and WISE 1738+2732, which were tentatively attributed to NH3 (ammonia) absorption — a compelling evidence for NH3 absorption.

See also 
The other five earliest brown dwarf discoveries from data collected by WISE:
 published by Burgasser et al. (2011):
 WISE 1617+1807 (T8, young and cloudy)
 WISE 1812+2721 (T8.5:, cloudless)
 WISE 2018-7423 (T7, possibly cloudy)
 WISE 2313-8037 (T8, also young and cloudy)
 WISE 2359-7335 (T5.5, cloudless)

The other eight objects, checked for binarity by Gelino et al. (2011) on Keck II:
 binarity found:
 WISE 1841+7000 (T5 + T5, newfound)
 binarity not found:
 WISE 0750+2725 (T8.5, newfound)
 WISE 1322–2340 (T8, newfound)
 WISE 1614+1739 (T9, newfound)
 WISE 1617+1807 (T8, discovered before by Burgasser et al. (2011))
 WISE 1627+3255 (T6, newfound)
 WISE 1653+4444 (T8, newfound)
 WISE 1741+2553 (T9, newfound)

Notes

References 

Binary stars
Brown dwarfs
T-type stars
Camelopardalis (constellation)
WISE objects